The University of North Carolina TEACCH Autism Program creates and disseminates community-based services, training programs, and research for individuals of all ages and skill levels with autism spectrum disorder (ASD), to enhance the quality of life for them and their families across the lifespan.

Overview

The Treatment and Education of Autistic and Related Communication Handicapped Children (TEACCH) philosophy recognizes autism as a lifelong condition and does not aim to cure but to respond to autism as a culture. Core tenets of the TEACCH philosophy include an understanding of the effects of autism on individuals; use of assessment to assist program design around individual strengths, skills, interests and needs; enabling the individual to be as independent as possible; working in collaboration with parents and families.

Strategies
The emphasis on individualization means that TEACCH does not distinguish between people with very high skill levels and those with learning disabilities. Strategies used are designed to address the difficulties faced by all people with autism, and be adaptable to whatever style and degree of support is required. TEACCH methodology is rooted in behavior therapy, more recently combining cognitive elements, guided by theories suggesting that behavior typical of people with autism results from underlying problems in perception and understanding. The strategies put forward by TEACCH do not work on the behavior directly, but on its underlying reasons, such as lack of understanding of what the person is expected to do or what will happen to them next, and sensory under- or over-stimulation. By addressing communication deficits, the person will be supported to express their needs and feelings by means other than challenging behavior.

Working from the premise that people with autism are predominantly visual learners, intervention strategies are based around physical and visual structure, schedules, work systems and task organization. Individualized systems aim to address difficulties with communication, organization, generalization, concepts, sensory processing, change and relating to others. Whereas some interventions focus on addressing areas of weakness, the TEACCH approach works with existing strengths and emerging skill areas.

Five Basic Principles 
To start, there lies an importance in creating structured and supportive physical surroundings to support student success. Next, it is recommended to display a physical schedule that can be accessed and referred to by the student throughout their day. Thirdly, the establishment of expectations and goals to support and encourage independence from the student with their tasks. Fourthly, a strong emphasis of a consistent routine. Finally, the incorporation of visual-cues for reminders.

International recognition
Most of the literature is of North American origin. The adoption of the TEACCH approach has been slower elsewhere. In 1993, Jones et al. stated that there was insufficient use of the TEACCH approach in the UK to include it in their study of interventions. In 2003 it was reported that Gary B. Mesibov and Eric Schopler describe TEACCH as the United Kingdom's most common intervention used with children with autism. In Europe and the United States, it is also a common intervention.

TEACCH runs conferences in North Carolina and organizes programs throughout the US and in the UK.

Program effectiveness
In '...A Guide for Practitioners', Jordan describes the literature on TEACCH as providing ‘very positive, but not remarkable, results’. 
A 2013 meta-analysis indicated that TEACCH has small or no effects on perceptual, motor, verbal, cognitive, and motor functioning, communication skills, and activities of daily living. There were positive effects in social and maladaptive behavior, but these results required further replication due to the methodological limitations of the pool of studies analyzed.

History
The TEACCH approach was developed at the University of North Carolina at Chapel Hill, originating in a child research project begun in 1964 by Eric Schopler and Robert Reichler. The results of this pilot study indicated that the children involved made good progress, and consequently state finance supported the formation of Division TEACCH.

Founded in 1971 by Eric Schopler, TEACCH provides training and services geared to helping autistic children and their families cope with the condition. Gary B. Mesibov, a professor and researcher on UNC's TEACCH program since about 1979, was director of the program from 1992 to 2010.

With over 40 years of experience working with autistic people, TEACCH methodology continues to evolve, refining its approach. It is a "pioneering" program for assisting with ASD education, research and service delivery for children and adults.

References

Further reading
 Gary Mesibov. Accessing the Curriculum for Pupils with Autistic Spectrum Disorders: Using the TEACCH Programme to Help Inclusion. Taylor & Francis; 20 June 2003. .
 Gary B. Mesibov; Victoria Shea; Eric Schopler. The TEACCH Approach to Autism Spectrum Disorders. Springer; 7 December 2004. .

External links
Official website

1966 establishments in North Carolina
Treatment of autism
Alternative therapies for developmental and learning disabilities